Cancer Bats are a Canadian hardcore punk band from Toronto, Ontario. They have released six studio albums and six extended plays. The band is composed of vocalist Liam Cormier, guitarist Scott Middleton, drummer Mike Peters and bassist Jaye R. Schwarzer.

Albums

Studio albums

EPs
2005: Cancer Bats
2007: This Is Hell / Cancer Bats 7"
2009: Cancer Bats / Rolo Tomassi <ref>{{cite web|url=http://www.alterthepress.com/2009/02/limited-edition-cancer-batsrolo-tomassi.html|title=Alter The Press!: Limited Edition Cancer Bats/Rolo Tomassi Split 7 Announced|publisher=|accessdate=15 September 2014}}</ref>
2009: Tour EP2010: Sabotage EP2011: Cancer Bats / Black Lungs2013: Bat Sabbath EP2019: New Damage Records Switcheroo Vol 1. : Cancer Bats / Single MothersMusic videos
Cancer Bats often incorporate their friends such as Alexisonfire in their music videos. In the French Immersion and Pneumonia Hawk videos the band parodied some of Dallas Green's City and Colour songs. Fellow Alexisonfire members George Pettit and Wade MacNeil performed guest vocals on the tracks "Pneumonia Hawk" and "Deathsmarch" respectively, and also appeared in the videos for the songs that included their respective contributions.

All of their music videos have been directed by Marc Ricciardelli except Old Blood and Road Sick which were directed by Vulture Culture Films.
 Hundred Grand Canyon (2006)
 French Immersion (2006)
 Pneumonia Hawk (2007)
 Hail Destroyer (2008)
 Lucifer's Rocking Chair (2008)
 Deathsmarch (2009)
 Sabotage (2010)
 Dead Wrong (2010)
 Scared to Death (2010)
 Old Blood (2012)
 Road Sick (2012)
 Bricks And Mortar (2012)
 R.A.T.S. (2013)
 Satellites (2014)
 True Zero (2015)
 Brightest Days (2018)
 Winterpeg (2018)
 Bed Of Nails (2018)
 Heads Will Roll (2018)
 Fear Will Kill Us All (2018)
 We Run Free (2018)
 Rattlesnake (2018)
 Headwound (2018)
 Space and Time (2018)
 Can't Sleep (2018)
 Gatekeeper'' (2018)

Members of Cancer Bats have also appeared in music videos by other bands, including '"Hey, It's Your Funeral Mama"' and "Waterwings" by Alexisonfire, "Vices" by Silverstein, "Chelsea Smile" by Bring Me the Horizon and "St. Andrew's" by Bedouin Soundclash.

References

Discographies of Canadian artists